A touchdown is the primary method of scoring in American and Canadian football.

Touchdown may also refer to:

Films, television, entertainment
 Eyeworks Touchdown, a New Zealand-based television production company
 Travis Touchdown, the main character in the No More Heroes series
 Touchdown (film), a 1931 pre-code football film

Music
 Touchdown (Bob James album), 1978
 Touchdown (Brakes album), 2009
 Touchdown (JTR album), 2014
 "Touchdown" (Game song), featuring Raheem DeVaughn
 "Touchdown" (T.I. song), featuring Eminem
 "Touchdown" (Trackshittaz song), 2011
 “Touchdown”, a song by Twice from their EP ’’Page Two’’

Sports
 Touchdown, a score in rugby league touch
 Touch down, a tie-breaker once used in association football
 Touchdown (mascot), the unofficial mascot of Cornell University
 The try in rugby, historically known as a touch down

Others
 Touchdown, the landing of an animal or craft
 Touchdown Club of Columbus
Touchdown Jesus, a statue facing the freeway near Monroe, Ohio
 Washington D.C. Touchdown Club, a charity/scholarship organization
 Touchdown polymerase chain reaction

See also

 
 
 Touch (disambiguation)
 Down (disambiguation)
 TD (disambiguation)